South Coast Flame FC are a soccer team based in the Illawarra, New South Wales. They compete in the NSW State League or the fourth tier of men’s soccer within Football NSW. The club was founded in 2017 and is run by the Football South Coast.

Foundation 
South Coast Flame FC was launched by Football South Coast in an attempt to create a pathway for the numerous junior teams which compete in the Skills Acquisition Program (SAP) and Association Youth League (AYL); and to indirectly compete with the established elite club in the area, the Wollongong Wolves. Football South Coast owner and chairman, Eddy De Gabriele said at the announcement of the club, “Like any start up, it is exciting and frightening but we decided that we have got to provide opportunities for the large number of players in the region.”

Current squad 
Correct as of 20 February 2018 Source: 

 (C)

References

External links

2017 establishments in Australia
Association football clubs established in 2017
Soccer clubs in New South Wales
South Coast (New South Wales)